Gočova is a settlement in the Municipality of Sveta Trojica v Slovenskih Goricah in northeastern Slovenia. The area is part of the traditional region of Styria and is now included in the Drava Statistical Region.

A number of Roman period burial mounds have been identified and some partly excavated near the settlement.

References

External links
Gočova at Geopedia

Populated places in the Municipality of Sveta Trojica v Slovenskih Goricah